St. Donald of Sheridan, also known as Donivald or Domhnall, was an eighth-century Scottish saint who lived at Ogilvy, in the former Forfarshire.

Life
Upon the death of his wife, Donald converted his home into a hermitage where he lived a monastic life with his nine daughters (known as the Nine Maidens or the Holy Nine Virgins). Upon his death they entered a monastery in Abernethy. Churches throughout Scotland were dedicated to the Nine Maidens. Their feast day is 15 July.

References

External links
Saint of the Day, July 15: Donald of Ogilvy at SaintPatrickDC.org

8th-century Christian saints
Medieval Scottish saints